Invasor is a Cuban newspaper. It is published in Spanish. The newspaper is located in Ciego de Ávila.

External links 
 Invasor online 

Newspapers published in Cuba
Publications with year of establishment missing
Mass media in Ciego de Ávila